George Robert Burman (born December 1, 1942) is a former American football center and long snapper. He played professionally for the Chicago Bears, Los Angeles Rams and Washington Redskins of the National Football League (NFL). He is credited as the first specialized long snapper of NFL, somebody whose roster spot was based on the long snap, and not other positions.  

He played college football at Northwestern University and was drafted in the 15th round of the 1964 NFL Draft. George Allen, then the head of scouting for the Chicago Bears, selected Burman, and proceeded to bring him to the Los Angeles Rams in 1966 and the Washington Redskins in 1971.

Burman began his long snapping with the Rams, working on the punts, but was still considered a backup offensive lineman. When Allen coaxed him out of retirement in the 1971 preseason to join Washington, Burman's roster spot was based on his long snap, not his offensive line play. His final game was Super Bowl VII; he missed the entire 1973 season with an injury, and then retired.

Burman earned two advanced degrees from the University of Chicago and went on to become a professor at Syracuse University, where he spent two decades and 13 years as dean of the university’s Martin J. Whitman School of Management.

External links

 Bears draftees recall last Chicago draft

References

1942 births
Living people
Players of American football from Chicago
American football offensive linemen
Northwestern Wildcats football players
Chicago Bears players
Los Angeles Rams players
Washington Redskins players
University of Chicago alumni
Syracuse University faculty